Scheunemann is a surname. Notable people with the surname include:

Gerald Scheunemann (born 1960), former professional German footballer
Pam Scheunemann (born 1955), American children's writer, known for her Cool Crafts picture books
Putra Arifin Scheunemann (born 1987), German-born Indonesian actor known professionally as Arifin Putra
Randy Scheunemann (born 1960), American neoconservative lobbyist
Timo Scheunemann (born 1973), Indonesian born German youth football coach and manager
Walter Scheunemann, recipient of Knight's Cross of the Iron Cross on 5 August 1940

See also
Scheunen